Waldheim is a quarter (Stadtteil) of the city Hanover in Germany about 10 km SSE from the city center, located at an elevation of 60 m above sea level. Part of the Stadtbezirk Döhren-Wülfel, it has 1,732 inhabitants (2020).

References

Boroughs and quarters of Hanover